Flight 406 may refer to:

Air France Flight 406, crashed on 10 May 1961
South African Airways Flight 406, crashed on 13 March 1967

0406